The International Shark Attack File is a global database of shark attacks. It began as an attempt to catalogue shark attacks on servicemen during World War II. The Office of Naval Research funded it from 1958 until 1968. During that time, a panel of shark experts developed a standard system for collecting accounts of shark attacks from around the world. The file was temporarily housed at the Mote Marine Laboratory in Sarasota, Florida, until a permanent home was found at the Florida Museum of Natural History at the University of Florida under the direction of George H. Burgess. It is currently under the direction of Dr. Gavin Naylor and members of the American Elasmobranch Society. The file contains information on over 6,600 shark attacks, and includes detailed, often privileged, information including autopsy reports and photos. The file is accessible only to scientists whose access is permitted by a review board.

A similar project called Global Shark Attack File is accessible to everybody as an XLS file that can be sorted by date and location of the shark attack.  However, information from this site does not go through the rigorous investigatory process as the original file, and data should be treated cautiously.

References

External links
 International Shark Attack File

Online databases
Databases in the United States
Sharks
Shark attacks